The head of government of the Principality of Andorra, alternatively known as the prime minister of Andorra, is the chief executive of the government of Andorra. They are appointed by the General Council. The position was created in 1982 after constitutional reforms separated the executive and legislative powers. Òscar Ribas Reig was elected as the country's first prime minister on 4 January 1982. The current prime minister is Xavier Espot Zamora, who has been in office since 16 May 2019.

Prime ministers of Andorra (1982–present)

See also

List of co-princes of Andorra

References

 
Politics of Andorra
Andorra
1982 establishments in Andorra